Maiduguri International Airport  is an airport serving Maiduguri, the capital of Borno State in Nigeria.

Airlines and destinations

See also
Transport in Nigeria
List of airports in Nigeria

References

External links

SkyVector Aeronautical Charts
OurAirports - Maiduguri

Airports in Nigeria
Borno State
Maiduguri